Luiz Augusto dos Anjos (born ) is a Brazilian male artistic gymnast, representing his nation at international competitions, including at the 2007 Pan American Games.

See also 
2006 World Artistic Gymnastics Championships: Qualification

References

Further reading 
 Pan American Games (Rio de Janeiro 2007)
 Pommel Horse Qualification Men (2006)

1987 births
Living people
Brazilian male artistic gymnasts
Place of birth missing (living people)
Gymnasts at the 2007 Pan American Games
Pan American Games medalists in gymnastics
Pan American Games silver medalists for Brazil
South American Games gold medalists for Brazil
South American Games silver medalists for Brazil
South American Games bronze medalists for Brazil
South American Games medalists in gymnastics
Competitors at the 2006 South American Games
Medalists at the 2007 Pan American Games
21st-century Brazilian people